Herher is a village in the Vayk Municipality of the Vayots Dzor Province of Armenia.

History 
Herher was once a fief of the Orbelian vassals, the Shahurnetsi family in the 13th century. Within the village is a 19th-century church of Saint Gevorg, and south is a shrine of Grigor Lusavorich from 1296 with Saint Gevorg or Chiki Vank of 1297.  Southeast one km on a hill is the small Kapuyt Berd ("Blue Fortress"). Upon a hilltop one km northeast is Saint Sion Monastery, first mentioned in the 8th century. At the complex are the churches of Saint Sion and Saint Astvatsatsin. Other sites of historical significance are in close proximity to Herher, such as village ruins with khachkars of the 14th century.

Gallery

References

External links 

 
 
 

Populated places in Vayots Dzor Province